Arkansas Highway 153 (AR 153, Ark. 153, and Hwy. 153) is the designation for a state highway which is entirely located in Arkansas County. The route begins at AR 17 just north of Ethel and ends at AR 130 a few miles east of Stuttgart. The route is very rural.

Route description 
The route runs concurrently with AR 1 for about  before heading splitting apart and heading towards the town of Crocketts Bluff. The route eventually intersects AR 33 at LaGrue, which also shares a short concurrency before continuing to head west.

Major intersections

References

External links

153
 Transportation in Arkansas County, Arkansas